is a cover album by the Irish pop group The Nolans. Released on 21 September 1991 exclusively in Japan by Teichiku Records, the album consists of 12 English-language covers of popular J-pop songs from the 1970s and 1980s. The title track, a cover of Wink's "Samishii Nettaigyo", was released as a single.

The album peaked at No. 99 on Oricon's albums chart and sold over 3,000 copies.

Track listing 
All English lyrics are written by Clive Scott and Des Dyer except track 1 by M. Jordan.

Charts

References

External links
 

1991 albums
The Nolans albums
Covers albums
Teichiku Records albums